Steven Edward Stucky (November 7, 1949 − February 14, 2016) was a Pulitzer Prize-winning American composer.

Life and career
Stucky was born in Hutchinson, Kansas. At age 9, he moved with his family to Abilene, Texas, where, as a teenager, he studied music in the public schools and, privately, viola with Herbert Preston, conducting with Leo Scheer, and composition with Macon Sumerlin. He attended Baylor University and Cornell. Stucky worked with Karel Husa and Daniel Sternberg.

Stucky wrote commissioned works for many of the major American orchestras, including Baltimore, Chicago, Cincinnati, Dallas, Los Angeles, New York, Minnesota, Philadelphia, Pittsburgh, St. Louis, and St. Paul. He was long associated with the Los Angeles Philharmonic, where he was resident composer 1988–2009 (the longest such affiliation in American orchestral history); he was host of the New York Philharmonic's Hear & Now series 2005–09; and he was Pittsburgh Symphony Composer of the Year for the 2011–12 season. For Pittsburgh, he composed Silent Spring, in honor of the 50th anniversary of Rachel Carson's epochal book of the same title. He teamed with the celebrated pianist and author Jeremy Denk to create his first opera, The Classical Style (based on the celebrated book by Charles Rosen), which premiered in June 2014 at the Ojai Music Festival. Other noteworthy compositions by Stucky include the symphonic poem Radical Light (2007), Rhapsodies for Orchestra (2008), the oratorio August 4, 1964 (2008), a Symphony (2012), and his Second Concerto for Orchestra (2003), which won the 2005 Pulitzer Prize for Music.

Stucky was an expert on the Polish composer Witold Lutosławski and authored the 1981 study Lutoslawski and His Music. He also was curator of the Philharmonia Orchestra's 2013 centenary celebration of that composer, Woven Words: Music Begins Where Words End. Stucky was the Given Foundation Professor of Composition at Cornell University in Ithaca, New York.

There he founded Ensemble X and led it for nine seasons, from 1997 until 2006, while at the same time he also was the guiding force behind the celebrated Green Umbrella series in Los Angeles. He has also taught at Eastman and Berkeley, the latter as Ernest Bloch Professor in 2003. After several earlier teaching and conducting visits, in 2013 he became artist-faculty composer-in-residence at the Aspen Music Festival and School. In 2014 he became Professor Emeritus at Cornell and joined the composition faculty at the Juilliard School.

Among the composers who studied with Stucky are Joseph Phibbs, Marc Mellits, Robert Paterson, David Conte, Thomas C. Duffy, Yotam Haber, James Matheson, Steven Burke, Xi Wang, Spencer Topel, Diego Vega, Fang Man, Anna Weesner, Hannah Lash, Andrew Waggoner, Stephen Andrew Taylor, Sean Shepherd, Chris Arrell and Jesse Jones. He taught master classes and served residencies around the world, including at the Central Conservatory of Music in Beijing, the Shanghai Conservatory of Music, the Cleveland Institute of Music, the Curtis Institute of Music, Rice University, Lawrence University Conservatory of Music, the Swedish Collegium for Advanced Study, the Tanglewood Music Center, and many others.

Stucky died of brain cancer at his home in Ithaca, New York on February 14, 2016.  His survivors include his second wife, Kristen Frey Stucky, his two children from his first marriage to Melissa Stucky, Matthew and Maura, two brothers, and two sisters.

Compositions

Orchestral
Kenningar (Symphony No. 4) (1977–78)
Transparent Things: In Memoriam V.N. (1980)
Double Concerto (1982–85, rev. 1989), for violin, oboe/oboe d'amore & chamber orchestra
Voyages (1983–84), for cello & orchestral winds
Dreamwaltzes (1986)
Concerto for Orchestra No. 1 (1986–87)
Son et Lumière (1988)
Threnos (1988), for wind ensemble
Angelus (1989–90)
Anniversary Greeting (1991)
Impromptus (1991)
Funeral Music for Queen Mary (after Purcell) (1992), for orchestral winds
To Whom I Said Farewell (1992, rev. 2003), for mezzo-soprano & chamber orchestra
Fanfare for Los Angeles (1993)
Ancora (1994)
Fanfares and Arias (1994), for wind ensemble
Fanfare for Cincinnati (1994)
Concerto for Two Flutes and Orchestra (1994)
Pinturas de Tamayo (1995)
Music for Saxophones and Strings (1996)
Concerto Mediterraneo (1998), for guitar & orchestra
Escondido Fanfare (1998)
American Muse (1999), for baritone & orchestra
Concerto for Percussion and Wind Orchestra (2001)
Colburn Variations (2002), for string orchestra
Etudes (2002), concerto for recorder & chamber orchestra
Spirit Voices (2002–03), concerto for percussion & orchestra
Second Concerto for Orchestra (2003)
Jeu de timbres (2003)
Hue and Cry (2006), for wind ensemble
Radical Light (2006–07)
Rhapsodies for Orchestra (2008)
Chamber Concerto (2009)
Silent Spring (2011)
Symphony (2012)

Opera
The Classical Style: An Opera (of Sorts) (2013–14), libretto by Jeremy Denk, after the book by Charles Rosen

Choral
Spring and Fall: To a Young Child (1972), for a cappella SATB choir
Drop, drop, slow tears (1979), for a cappella SSAATTBB choir
Cradle Songs (1997), for a cappella SATB choir
To Musick (2000), for a cappella men's choir
Skylarks (2001), for a cappella S.A. & SATB choir
Whispers (2002), for a cappella SATB soli & SATTBB choir
Three New Motets (2005), for a cappella double SATB choir (O admirabile commercium, O sacrum convivium, O vos omnes)
Eyesight (2007), for a cappella SATB choir
August 4, 1964 (2007–08), for soprano, mezzo-soprano, tenor & baritone soli, SATB choir & orchestra
The Kingdom of God (In No Strange Land) (2008), for a cappella SATB choir
Gravity’s Dream (2009), for a cappella SATB choir
Say Thou Dost Love Me (2012) for a cappella SATB choir
Take Him, Earth (2012) for SATB choir with chamber orchestra
Winter Stars (2014) for a cappella SATB choir
The Music of Light (2015) for double a cappella SATB choir

Chamber
Duo (1969), for viola & cello
Movements (1970), for four celli
Quartet (1972–73), for clarinet, viola, cello & piano
Movements III.: Seven Sketches (1976), for flute & clarinet
Refrains (1976), for five percussion
Notturno (1981), for alto saxophone & piano
Varianti (1982), for flute, clarinet & piano
Boston Fancies (1985), for flute, clarinet, percussion, piano, violin, viola & cello
Serenade (1990), for wind quintet
Birthday Fanfare (1993), for three trumpets
Salute (1997), for flute, clarinet, horn, trombone, percussion, piano, violin & cello
Ad Parnassum (1998), for flute, clarinet, percussion, piano, violin & cello
Ai due amici (1998), for chamber ensemble
Tres Pinturas (1998), for violin & piano
Nell'ombra, nella luce (1999–2000), for string quartet
Partita-Pastorale after J.S.B. (2000), for clarinet, piano & string quartet
Tamayo Nocturne (2001), for chamber ensemble
Sonate en forme de préludes (2003–04), for oboe, horn & harpsichord
Meditation and Dance (2004), for clarinet & piano
Piano Quartet (2005), for violin, viola, cello & piano
Four Postcards (2008), for wind quintet & marimba
Piano Quintet (2009–10), for two violins, viola, cello & piano
Scherzino (2010), for alto saxophone and piano
Allegretto quasi Andantino (Schubert Dream) (2010), for piano four hands
Aus der Jugendzeit (2011), for bass-baritone, flute, clarinet/bass clarinet, violin, cello, piano, and percussion
Rain Shadow (2012), for violin, viola, cello & piano
 Sonata for Violin and Piano (2013)
 Cantus (2015), for 6 players

Vocal
Sappho Fragments (1982), for female voice & chamber ensemble
Two Holy Sonnets of Donne (1982), mezzo-soprano, oboe & piano
Four Poems of A.R. Ammons (1992), for baritone & chamber ensemble
To Whom I Said Farewell (1992, rev. 2003), for mezzo-soprano & chamber orchestra
American Muse (1999), for baritone & orchestra
Aus der Jugendzeit (2010–11), for baritone & chamber ensemble
The Stars and the Roses (2013), for tenor & orchestra
The Stars and the Roses (2013), for tenor & chamber ensemble
Out of the Cradle Endlessly Rocking (2014), for bass-baritone & piano

Solo instrumental
Three Little Variations for David (2000), for solo piano
Album Leaves (2002), for solo piano
Dialoghi (2006), for solo cello
Dust Devil (2009), for solo marimba
Isabelle Dances (2009–10), for solo marimba
Sonata for Piano (2014)

Arrangements of music by other composers
Noctuelles (Miroirs, No.1) (Maurice Ravel, orch. Stucky 2001) (Theodore Presser Co.)
Les Noces (Igor Stravinsky, orch. Stucky 2005), for solo voices, SATB. and full orchestra (Chester Music)
Bucolics (Witold Lutosławski, arr. Stucky 2006), for 9 instruments (Chester Music)
Eight Songs from the Spanish Songbook (Hugo Wolf, orch. Stucky 2008), for mezzo-soprano & orchestra (Theodore Presser Co.)
Four songs for the Dolce Suono Ensemble and baritone voice ("Per questa bella mano", "Ruhe sanft" (from Zaide), and "Das Veilchen" by Mozart; "Erlkönig" by Schubert, arr. Stucky 2012) (Theodore Presser Co.)

Awards
1974: ASCAP Victor Herbert Prize for composition
1975: First Prize, American Society of University Composers Competition
1978: Composer Fellowship, National Endowment for the Arts
1982: ASCAP Deems Taylor Award (for "Lutoslawski and His Music")
1986: John Simon Guggenheim Fellowship
1989: Finalist, Pulitzer Prize for Music (Concerto for Orchestra No. 1)
1991: Koussevitzky Music Foundation Commission
1995: Special Commendation, National Association of Composers USA
1997: Bogliasco Foundation Fellowship, Centro Studi Ligure (Italy)
1998: Barlow Endowment Commission
2001: Aaron Copland Fund for American Music recording grant
2002: Goddard Lieberson Fellowship, American Academy of Arts and Letters
2003: Bloch Lecturer, University of California at Berkeley
2005: Pulitzer Prize for Music for Second Concerto for Orchestra
2006: Paul Fromm Composer-in-Residence, American Academy in Rome
2006: Elected a trustee of the American Academy in Rome
2006: Elected to the American Academy of Arts and Sciences
2006: Joined Board of Directors of the Koussevitzky Music Foundation
2007: Elected to the American Academy of Arts and Letters
2008: Elected Chair of the Board of Directors, American Music Center
2011: Elected Vice-Chair of the Board of Directors, New Music USA
2011: Composer of the Year, Pittsburgh Symphony Orchestra, 2011/12 season
2013: August 4, 1964 Grammy Award nominee for Best Classical Contemporary Composition
 2013: Brock Commission

References

External links

Steven Stucky profile, Presser.com
Interview with Steven Stucky, April 23, 1992

1949 births
2016 deaths
21st-century classical composers
Aspen Music Festival and School faculty
Baylor University alumni
Cornell University alumni
Cornell University faculty
Deaths from cancer in New York (state)
Deaths from brain cancer in the United States
People from Hutchinson, Kansas
People from Abilene, Texas
Pulitzer Prize for Music winners
Musicians from Kansas
Eastman School of Music faculty
University of California, Berkeley faculty
21st-century American composers
American male classical composers
American classical composers
20th-century classical composers
20th-century American composers
Classical musicians from Texas
20th-century American male musicians
21st-century American male musicians